Cankili II  (died 1619) was the last king of the Jaffna kingdom and was a usurper who came to throne with a palace massacre of the royal prince and the regent Arasa-kesari in 1617. His regency was rejected by the Portuguese colonials in Colombo, Sri Lanka. His reign was secured with military forces from the Thanjavur Nayaks and Karaiyar captains. He was defeated by the Portuguese in 1619 and was taken to Goa and beheaded. With his death the Aryacakravarti line of Kings who had ruled the kingdom for over 300 years came to an end.

Usurping the throne
With the death of Ethirimana Cinkam in 1617, there were three claimants to the throne. One was Cankili II, a nephew of the king. The other two claimants were the king's brother Arasakesari and a powerful chieftain Periye Pillai Arachchi. Ethirimana Cinkam's son, a minor was proclaimed as king with Arasakesari as regent. Cankili II killed the claimants to the throne and other princes of royal blood and usurped the throne.

Cankili II was, under the Portuguese, made the governor of Jaffna in 1617 and paid tribute to them on the promise that he had no contact with the Karaiyar captains.

Local uprising

The palace massacre created unrest among the people of the Jaffna kingdom. Migapulle Arachchi, the son of Periye Pillai Arachchi, with the aid of the Portuguese drove Cankili to Kayts in August–September 1618. Cankili had to seek aid from Raghunatha Nayak, the king of Thanjavur Nayak kingdom, who sent an army of 5000 men under the command of Khem Nayak (also known as Varunakulattan) to put down the uprising.

Downfall 
By June 1619, there were two Portuguese military expeditions to the Jaffna kingdom: a naval expedition which was repulsed by Khem Nayak and his troops, and a land expedition by Filipe de Oliveira and his army of 5,000, which was eventually able to defeat Cankili.

Cankili's remaining soldiers were beheaded by Portuguese without trial. Cankili himself was taken to Goa and was sentenced to death. Before his decapitation in 1623, he was converted and baptised as Dom Felipe. The surviving members of the royal family were also taken to Goa and asked to become monks or nuns in the holy orders. Most obliged, and their celibacy avoided the production of further claimants to the Jaffna throne.

See also
List of Jaffna monarchs

Notes

References
 

1619 deaths
Kings of Jaffna
Hindu martyrs
Sri Lankan Hindus
Sri Lankan Tamil royalty
Year of birth unknown
17th-century monarchs in Asia